The Sleipner class was a class of six destroyers built for the Royal Norwegian Navy from 1936 until the German invasion in 1940. The design was considered advanced for its time, and it was the first class of vessels for the Norwegian Navy that used aluminium in the construction of the bridge, the mast and the outer funnel. Extra strength special steel was used in the construction of the hull. Unlike the earlier  the Sleipner class had comparatively good capabilities in both main guns, anti-aircraft artillery and anti-submarine weapons. The class was named after Sleipnir, the eight-legged horse of Odin.

Armament
The armament within the class varied slightly. Æger had the armament listed in the article info-box. Sleipner, the lead ship of the class, carried just two 10 cm guns and could not elevate them for use as anti-aircraft weapons. Gyller had two extra torpedo tubes, for a total of four. Odin had a 20 mm anti aircraft gun instead of a 40 mm. Balder and Tor had not been finished when the Germans attacked, and it is not known if any changes in armament were planned.

Although classified by the Norwegians as destroyers they have been widely regarded as torpedo boats because of their displacement and armament.

Fates
The vessels had quite different fates. Æger was bombed by German planes on 9 April 1940, and wrecked with loss of life. Sleipner was in Norwegian service throughout World War II, and was kept in service until 1959. Gyller and Odin were captured by the Germans in 1940 at Kristiansand. Balder and Tor were captured unfinished at the shipyard and put into German service after completion.

Gyller and Odin were returned to the Royal Norwegian Navy after the war and kept in service until 1959. Finished by the Germans, Balder and Tor were used by them until the end of the war in 1945. Balder was scrapped in 1952, Tor in 1959.

The Germans re-classed the ships as Torpedoboot Ausland and renamed them: Gyller to Löwe, Odin to Panther,  Balder to Leopard, and Tor to Tiger.

In 1945 Löwe was one of the escorts to the Wilhelm Gustloff on her last voyage. The Wilhelm Gustloff was torpedoed and sank with a great loss of life. During the sinking, Löwe came alongside and rescued 472 of her passengers and crew.

Ship list

Footnotes

References

Literature
 
 

Destroyer classes